The Pyeongchang Olympic Village is a complex of high-rise apartments in Pyeongchang County, South Korea. As an Olympic Village, it hosted the attendees (which included competitors and their coaches) during the 2018 Winter Olympics.

References

Venues of the 2018 Winter Olympics
Olympic Villages
Sports venues in Pyeongchang County
Buildings and structures in Pyeongchang County